The Akhil Bharatiya Akhara Parishad , one of the organizations of Hindu Sants (saints) and sadhus (ascetics) in India. The ABAP is composed of 14 akharas, or organisations of Hindu sants and sadhus. Nirmohi Akhara (involved in the Ram Janmabhoomi dispute in Ayodhya) and Shri Dattatreya Akhara are two of the prominent akharas which are part of it.

Organisation
The Akhil Bharatiya Akhara Parishad is based on the system of akharas in Hindu society. An akhara literally means a wrestling ring in Hindi, but also stands for a place of debate. There are 14 such organisations based on the form of Hinduism and Hindu philosophy they adhere to. Most Akharas are Vaishnavas (devotees of Vishnu) and Shaivas (devotees of Shiva).

History
The system of akharas may date as far back as early 8th century, when Adi Shankaracharya is believed to have established seven akharas (possibly 10 as they are also known as Dasnaami): Mahanirvani, Niranjani, Juna, Atal, Avahan, Agni and Anand Akhara. The earliest recorded founding of an akhara was that of the Abhana in 547 CE. During periods of Muslim rule in India and later British rule, the akharas congregated and organised together, especially during the Kumbha Mela to work for the preservation of Hindu religion and culture. In 1565, Madhusudana Sarasvati started preparing akharas as an armed military force to resist invasions and protect Hindus.

Politics
While the ABAP does not participate in electoral politics, it has a position of great importance in Hindu society as a leading Hindu leadership organisation. At times, it has cooperated with the Vishva Hindu Parishad (VHP), a Hindu religious organisation more openly involved in politics and part of the Sangh Parivar of Hindu nationalist organisations. However, the ABAP has also openly criticised the VHP for raising unnecessary controversies and refused to follow an agenda set by the VHP.

The Akhil Bharatiya Akhara Parishad has encouraged and supported the movement for the construction of a Ram Janmabhumi Temple on the site where the now-demolished Babri Mosque stood in Ayodhya. The place is believed to be the site of birth of the Hindu deity Rama. In 1989, the Nirmohi Akhara filed litigation regarding the site, and in 2010 their claim was upheld by the Allahabad High Court, which gave the akhara control of one-third of the site. The ABAP welcomed the verdict, asserting that it would prevent further exploitation of the issue by political parties.

They are known to sanction anyone who misused Hinduism.

13 akharas
As of January 2019 there were 13 recognised akharas, with Juna Akhara being the largest. Seven of these akharas were founded by Adi Shankaracharya. There are 3 types of akharas; Nirvani Ani Akhada, Digambar Ani Akhada and Nirmal Ani Akhada.

Nirvani Ani Akhada
It has the largest number of akhadas for the Sadhu Sants and the Naga Sadhus as well. There are seven Nirvani Ani Akhadas:

 Shri Panchdashnaam Juna Akhada (Varanasi): It is the largest of the 13 Akhadas. The Juna Akhada follows the Dashnaami Sampraday of Shaivism founded by Adi Shankaracharya. They worship Lord Dattatreya. The Kinnar Akhara (Transgender Akhara) is also under the Juna Akhada.
 Shri Panchayati Niranjani Akhada (Prayagraj): It is the second largest akhada. It was founded in 904 AD in Gujarat. Niranjani Akhada worships Kartikeya. The Niranjani Akhada consists of a lot of educated persons having doctorate and post graduation.  
 Shri Panch Atal Akhada  (Varanasi): It is one of three oldest Akhadas. They worships Lord Ganesha and the holy symbols of Bhairva Prakash Bhala and Surya Prakash Bhala. 
 Shri Panchdashnaam Aavahan Akhada (Varanasi): It is the oldest monastic order. They worship Dattatreya. 
 Taponidhi Shri Anand Panchayati Akhada (Nasik): It is the second oldest Akhara. The deity of this Akhada is Dev Bhuwan Bhaskar Suryanarayan.
 Shri Panchayati Mahanirvani Akhada (Prayagraj):The deity of the Akhara is Sage Kapilmuni and they have holy symbols like Bhairva Prakash Bhala and Surya Prakash Bhala. 
 Shri Panchdashnaam Panchagni Akhada/Shri Shambhu Panchagni Akhara (Junagarh): They are Brahmchari saints. They differ from other Shaivite akharas as they do not practice dhuni (the fire sacrifice) and do not consume any intoxicant and wear janau or the sacred thread.

Digambar Ani Akhada
It is also known as Bairagi Akhadas. They are Vaishnavas (followers of  Lord Vishnu). It contains three akhadas, they are:
 Shri Nirmohi Ani Akhara (Mathura):It was formed in Vrindavan by uniting 18 Vaishnav groups. They worships Lord Hanuman 
 Shri Digambar Ani Akhara (Sabarkantha)
 Shri Nirvani Ani Akhara (Ayodhya)

Nirmal Ani Akhada
It has three akhadas and they are known as Udasin. They are:
 Shri Panchayati Bada Udasin Akhada (Prayagraj): They follow the teachings of Sri Chand, the elder son of Guru Nanak.It was founded in 1825 by Yogiraj Shree Nirvandev ji Maharaj in Haridwar.
 Shri Panchayti Naya Udasin Akhada (Haridwar) : It was formed by Mahant Sudhir Das in 1846 following a dispute with the Shri Panchayati Bada Udasin Akhada. 
 Shri Nirmal Panchayati Akhada (Haridwar): They follow Nirmal Sampraday .It was founded in 1856 in Punjab by Durga Singh Maharaj. It has close ties with Sikhi in Sanatani way.

References

External links 

 

18th-century establishments in British India
Hindu organisations based in India
Hindu religious orders